Saeed Al Sulaiti (born 21 March 1985) is a Qatari motorcycle racer. He made his Grand Prix debut in the Moto2 class as a wild-card rider in the 2017 Qatar Grand Prix.

Career statistics

Superbike World Championship

Races by year
(key)

Grand Prix motorcycle racing

By season

Races by year
(key)

Supersport World Championship

Races by year
(key)

References

External links

1985 births
Living people
Qatari motorcycle racers
Moto2 World Championship riders
Superbike World Championship riders
Supersport World Championship riders
People from Doha